Thutha Rai Bahadar is a town and union council of Gujrat District, in the Punjab province of Pakistan. It is one of the biggest village of Chib Rajputs.   It is part of Kharian Tehsil and is located at an altitude of 306 metres (1007 feet).

Surrounding villages
Goteriala
Malikpur jattan
Lehri
Samrala
Kana Karam Khan
Hassam
Sadwal

References

Union councils of Gujrat District
Populated places in Gujrat District